Barry Miller (born February 6, 1958) is an American actor.  He won Broadway's 1985 Tony Award as Best Actor (Featured Role - Play) for his performance in Biloxi Blues.

Early life
Miller was born at Cedars of Lebanon Hospital in Los Angeles, California to Sidney Miller, an actor, director, and writer, and Iris Burton, an agent. His former stepmother is actress Dorothy Green. He attended Bancroft Junior High School, in Hollywood, and Fairfax High School.

Career
In addition to Biloxi Blues, Miller acted on Broadway in Crazy He Calls Me (1992).

He had prominent roles in Saturday Night Fever, Fame, and Peggy Sue Got Married.

One of his most major film roles was playing Reuven Malter in 1981's The Chosen.

Filmography

 The Waltons (1973) (TV) - Craska
 Brock's Last Case (1973) (TV movie) - Staats
 Shazam! (1974-1975) (TV) - Mike
 Joe and Sons (1975-1976) (TV series) - Mark Vitale
 Lepke (1975) - Young Lepke
 Adam-12 (1975) (TV) - Tom Bell
 The Secrets of Isis (1976) (TV)
 Having Babies (1976) (TV) - Kenneth McNamara
 The Death of Richie (1977) (TV) - Domenic
 Szysznyk (1977) (TV) - Fortwengler
 Saturday Night Fever (1977) - Bobby C.
 Wonder Woman (1979) (TV) - Barney
 Voices (1979) - Raymond Rothman
 Fame (1980) - Ralph
 The Chosen (1981) - Reuven Malter
 King of America (1982) (TV)
 The Roommate (1985) (TV)
 The Journey of Natty Gann (1985) - Parker
 Peggy Sue Got Married (1986) - Richard Norvik
 Conspiracy: The Trial of the Chicago 8 (1987) (TV movie) - Jerry Rubin
 The Sicilian (1987) - Dr. Nattore
 The Last Temptation of Christ (1988) - Jeroboam
 Love at Large (1990) - Marty
 Equal Justice (1990) (TV) - Pete 'Briggs' Brigman
 The Pickle (1993) - Ronnie Liebowitz
 Love Affair (1994) - Robert Crosley
 NYPD Blue (1994) (TV)
 The Practice (1997) (TV) - Douglas Colson
 Flawless (1999) - Leonard Wilcox
 Shortcut to Happiness (2007) - Mike Weiss

References

External links

Further reading
 
 
 

1958 births
Living people
Male actors from Los Angeles
American male film actors
American male stage actors
American male television actors
Fairfax High School (Los Angeles) alumni
Jewish American male actors
Tony Award winners
21st-century American Jews